Elkin Ramírez (26 October 1962 – 29 January 2017) was a Colombian singer-songwriter, and leader of the band Kraken.

Ramírez was born in the Belén neighborhood of Medellín, Antioquia, in October 1962. He was a self-taught artist, training himself and his vocal technique. He belonged to bands such as Kripzy (1981–1982) and Ferrotrack (1983–1984). In 1985, Ramirez joined Kraken as founder and leader. He was the author and composer of most of the band's songs, concept and lyrics; he was also the lead singer. In 2008, Ramírez debuted as an actor playing a hit man in the Colombian feature film Cain's Ethic (La Etica de Cain) directed by Edward Ruiz.

Ramírez died from brain cancer on 29 January 2017 in Medellín. He was 54.

References

External links
 

1962 births
2017 deaths
Colombian male film actors
20th-century Colombian male singers
Colombian rock singers
People from Medellín
Deaths from brain tumor
Deaths from cancer in Colombia